Anthony Mancini KGOHS (born November 27, 1945) is a Canadian prelate of the Roman Catholic Church who served as the Archbishop of Halifax-Yarmouth. He retired on November 27, 2020.

Biography

Early life
Born in Mignano Monte Lungo, near Naples, Mancini emigrated to Canada with his family, arriving at Pier 21 on December 1, 1948, and was raised in Montreal.

Education
Archbishop Mancini received a Bachelor of Arts from Resurrection College at the University of Waterloo, a Licentiate in Theology from Université de Montréal, a Master of Arts in religious studies from McGill University, studies in ecumenical theology at the University of Geneva and his Doctor of Philosophy in pastoral theology at Université de Montréal.

Career
Archbishop Mancini was ordained a priest in the Archdiocese of Montreal on May 23, 1970. On February 18, 1999, he was appointed an Auxiliary Bishop of Montreal by Cardinal Jean-Claude Turcotte.

On October 18, 2007, he was appointed to the Archdiocese of Halifax, succeeding Archbishop Terrence Thomas Prendergast as the ordinary. At the same time, Mancini was appointed Apostolic Administrator of the Diocese of Yarmouth after Bishop James Matthew Wingle was transferred to the Diocese of Saint Catharines. He was installed to these positions on November 29, 2007.

On September 26, 2009, Archbishop Mancini also became the Apostolic Administrator of the Diocese of Antigonish following the resignation of Bishop Raymond Lahey. This lasted until November 21, 2009, when the Holy See appointed Bishop Brian Dunn as ordinary of that diocese.

On November 25, 2020, a report was released detailing how a Catholic church-commissioned investigation led by former Quebec Superior Court justice Pepita Capriolo found that Mancini was among the former Archdiocese of Montreal officials who took no action against Father Brian Boucher after receiving reports Boucher sexually abused boys. Boucher pled guilty in January 2019 to sex abuse charges and received an eight-year prison sentence.

Archbishop Mancini retired on his 75th birthday, November 27, 2020.

References

External links
Catholic-hierarchy.org 

1945 births
Living people
People from the Province of Caserta
21st-century Roman Catholic archbishops in Canada
Italian emigrants to Canada
University of Waterloo alumni
McGill University alumni
Université de Montréal alumni
Roman Catholic archbishops of Halifax